St. John is an eroded lunar impact crater on the Moon's far side. This crater is situated to the northeast of the huge walled plain Mendeleev, and southwest of the crater Kohlschütter. To the east of St. John is the small crater Mills.

This is a heavily worn and eroded crater formation that is now little more than an uneven depression in the surface. It is scarcely distinguishable from the surrounding terrain, except from the shadows cast by the outer rim. The interior floor is uneven and marked by a chain of three small craterlets near the midpoint.

The crater is named after Charles Edward St. John, an American astronomer.

Satellite craters
By convention these features are identified on lunar maps by placing the letter on the side of the crater midpoint that is closest to St. John.

References

 
 
 
 
 
 
 
 
 
 
 
 

Impact craters on the Moon